Sebrus perdentellus is a moth in the family Crambidae. It was described by George Hampson in 1919. It is found in Malawi.

References

Endemic fauna of Malawi
Crambinae
Moths described in 1919